Neabsco Creek is a  tributary of the lower tidal segment of the Potomac River in eastern Prince William County, Virginia. The name Neabsco is derived from a Doeg village recorded as Niopsco by early English colonists. The creek has served as a vital waterway for trade and commerce in northern Virginia since the eighteenth century.

The Neabsco's watershed is highly developed because of its proximity to the I-95 corridor and the Washington, D.C. metropolitan area. The EPA Office of Water recently identified the Neabsco Creek watershed as an "area of significant habitat degradation due to a loss of natural land cover and storm water management facilities designed without consideration for environmental conditions." Most of Dale City and Woodbridge empty into Neabsco Creek.

Prince William County has made significant investments to offset stormwater impacts throughout the watershed. The U.S. Army Corps of Engineers proposal to dredge Neabsco Creek to help alleviate flooding on Route 1 was never funded, and the area continues to flood on a routine basis. Congressman Tom Davis secured more than $4 million in funds to clean up the Dale Service Corporation's sewage treatment plant on Neabsco Creek.

Neabsco Creek was the site of Neabsco Iron Works, one of the first iron production furnace plantations in northern Virginia. It operated on the creek from 1737 to 1820 at a site just above the present-day I-95 crossing.

See also
List of rivers of Virginia

References

External links
Prince William Conservation Alliance
Neabsco Iron Works

Rivers of Prince William County, Virginia
Rivers of Virginia
Tributaries of the Potomac River